Geoffrey Foot may refer to

 Geoffrey Foot (politician) (1915–2009), Tasmanian politician
 Geoffrey Foot (film editor) (1915–2010), British film editor